Powertech may refer to:

 Hyundai Powertech, a South Korean automatic transmission manufacturer
 PowerTech (flashlight manufacturer), Tennessee manufacturer
 Powertech Technology, PTI, Taiwanese chip assembler
 PowerTech Information Systems, Norwegian IP
 Chrysler PowerTech engine (V6 and V8 engines)
 Chrysler PowerTech engine (disambiguation) (I4 and I6 engines)

See also
 Powertec RPA
 Powertek